AKM Aminul Haque is a Bangladeshi marine biologist who served as the vice-chancellor of Bangladesh Agricultural University for two terms during 1980–1988. In 2006, he was appointed as a National Professor by the Government of Bangladesh for five years. He is currently serving as the director of marine of the Department of Fisheries under the Ministry of Fisheries and Livestock. He is a former adviser, with the rank of minister, of Shahabuddin Ahmed caretaker government.

Education
Haque completed his bachelor's from the University of Dhaka in 1950 and master's from University of the Punjab in 1952. He earned his Ph.D. from the University of Nottingham in 1957. His specialization is in fisheries and cetacean biology.

Career
Haque is an elected fellow of Bangladesh Academy of Sciences since 1988. He served the vice-president of the institute during 2008–2012.

Haque founded the Faculty of Fisheries at Bangladesh Agricultural University. Professor Dr. A. K. M. Aminul Haque, the "Father of Fisheries Education in Bangladesh" was the founder head of 3 (three) departments and the founder Dean of the FoF as well. Professor Dr. A. K. M. Aminul Haque served as Head of the FT from April 10, 1967, to June 29, 1971.

References

Living people
University of Dhaka alumni
University of the Punjab alumni
Alumni of the University of Nottingham
Academic staff of Bangladesh Agricultural University
Bangladeshi marine biologists
Vice-Chancellors of Bangladesh Agricultural University
National Professors of Bangladesh
Fellows of Bangladesh Academy of Sciences
Year of birth missing (living people)
Place of birth missing (living people)
Advisors of Caretaker Government of Bangladesh